Benjamin Saunders (born April 13, 1983), is an American mixed martial artist who currently fights in the Welterweight division. He was a featured fighter on The Ultimate Fighter: Team Hughes vs. Team Serra, fighting on Team Serra. A professional competitor since 2004, Saunders has formerly competed in the UFC and Bellator.

Background
Saunders was born in Fort Lauderdale, Florida where he lived until he was in the third grade when he moved to Coral Springs, Florida. Saunders parents were divorced, and as a result he lived with his father. His older brother, Jacob, who practiced karate, helped teach his younger brother about the martial art. His twin brother, Joe, is a former member of the Florida Legislature. When Saunders was eight years old, he had a friend who was learning Tang Soo Do, which the two soon began practicing daily. However, due to poor financial status Saunders was unable to pay for legitimate instruction. At the age of 14, Saunders began training in Jeet Kune Do and worked at fast food restaurants so that he could pay the tuition. He worked out with his J. P. Taravella High School wrestling team where he learned wrestling techniques in exchange for submission techniques that he knew. Saunders, although not an instigator of street fights, did not back down from challenges and was also involved in countless street fights while growing up. At the age of 18, Saunders told his parents that he was leaving for Valencia College, when in fact he was going to train with Din Thomas to become a professional fighter.

Mixed martial arts career

The Ultimate Fighter
Saunders defeated Dan Barrera in the first round of the competition by majority decision. Saunders reportedly contracted influenza after the Barrera bout. Despite the illness, Saunders competed in the quarter-finals against Tom Speer, losing via unanimous decision.

Ultimate Fighting Championship
Saunders defeated Dan Barrera at The Ultimate Fighter: Team Hughes vs Team Serra Finale by unanimous decision.

In his second career UFC fight, Saunders defeated UFC newcomer Ryan Thomas by armbar in the second round.

In his third career UFC fight he fought Brandon Wolff, defeating him in the first round via TKO with knees from the Thai clinch, landing 42 knees on his opponent. This left Wolff's face a bloody and swollen mess. After the bout many comparisons were made between him and Anderson Silva, who is also known for his Thai clinch prowess.

Saunders' next fight was supposed to be at UFC 96 against Welterweight standout Dustin Hazelett, but due to injury Hazelett pulled out of the match. Saunders was then set to face UFC newcomer Ryan Madigan. However, Saunders later pulled out of the match due to an injured foot.

On February 28, 2009, it was confirmed that Saunders would be facing Mike Swick at UFC 99. Saunders was defeated by Swick by TKO in the second round. As Swick struck, Saunders ducked into Swick's striking range every time which essentially cost him the fight.

Saunders defeated Marcus Davis on November 21, 2009, via KO due to multiple knees at 3:24 into the first round at UFC 106 making him the first man to knock out Davis.

Saunders was expected to face off against top ten welterweight Martin Kampmann at UFC 111 in March. However, an injury forced Kampmann off the card and Saunders was set to face Jake Ellenberger. On March 25, 2010, news broke that Thiago Alves's pre-fight CT scan found an irregularity in his brain, and he was not cleared to fight. Saunders asked to fight Alves's opponent and former #1 contender Jon Fitch, forcing Saunder's opponent Ellenberger out of the match. Saunders lost to Fitch by unanimous decision.

Saunders next faced Dennis Hallman on August 7, 2010 at UFC 117. Ben lost the fight by unanimous decision (29-28, 30-27, 29-28). Following the loss, Saunders was cut from the UFC.

Bellator
On February 3, it was announced by Bellator that they had signed Saunders to compete in their Welterweight division. Although he will not be a part of the Season Four Tournament, Saunders fights aired live on the main card.

At Bellator 39 Saunders defeated Matt Lee by TKO (doctor stoppage) in the third round after brutalizing Lee in the clinch with knees and elbows for most of the fight.

Saunders was expected to fight at Bellator 47 but had to pull out of the event due to an undisclosed injury he suffered in training.

Saunders was expected to face Rick Hawn at Bellator 49. But Hawn later pulled out of the bout due to a knee injury. Saunders instead fought replacement Chris Cisneros. Saunders won by TKO in the third round.

In the semifinals, Saunders faced Luis Santos at Bellator 53. After getting taken down in the beginning of the first round, Saunders controlled the round by stifling Santos' offense and going for many submission attempts, transitioning from the reverse triangle to the omoplata. The second round played out in similar fashion with Saunders almost getting an omoplata and a carni on two separate occasions. Saunders eventually submitted his opponent via americana armlock transitioning from an arm triangle attempt while in half guard  in the third round.

In the finals, he faced Douglas Lima at Bellator 57 and lost via KO in the second round.

Saunders took part in Bellator Season Six Welterweight Tournament. Saunders faced Raul Amaya in the quarterfinals at Bellator 63 and won by unanimous decision.

Saunders lost by unanimous decision to Bryan Baker in the semifinals at Bellator 67.

Saunders defeated Brian Warren in just 22 seconds of the first round by TKO due to Knee Strikes at Bellator 72.

Bellator MMA announced Saunders as a competitor in the Bellator's Season Eight Welterweight Tournament. Saunders defeated Koffi Adzitso via unanimous decision at Bellator 86 in the Quarterfinals.

Saunders rematched Raul Amaya at Bellator 90 in the semifinals and won via KO due to a head kick in round one.

Saunders was scheduled to face Douglas Lima in a rematch in the tournament final at Bellator 93. However, Lima broke his hand so the match was rescheduled for later this year. Saunders eventually faced Lima on September 20, 2013 at Bellator 100.  He lost the fight via knockout due to a head kick in the second round. After the loss, Saunders was released from the promotion.

Titan Fighting Championships
In June 2014, Saunders signed with Titan Fighting Championships. For his first fight with the promotion, Saunders was scheduled face UFC veteran Matt Riddle for the vacant TFC Welterweight Championship at Titan FC 29 on August 22, 2014. Riddle, however, withdrew from the bout and was replaced by MMA veteran Jose Landi-Jons.  However, that fight was cancelled when Titan FC granted Saunders permission to return to the UFC.

Return to the UFC
On August 7, 2014, it was announced that Saunders would return to fight for the UFC.  Saunders faced promotional newcomer Chris Heatherly on August 23, 2014 at UFC Fight Night 49. He was successful in his return, winning the fight in the first round with the first successful omoplata submission in the UFC. The impressive victory also earned Saunders his first Performance of the Night bonus award.

Saunders then faced Joe Riggs on December 13, 2014 at UFC on Fox 13. He won the fight by TKO due to injury after Riggs hurt his neck during a takedown and tapped out.

Saunders was expected to face Erick Silva on March 21, 2015 at UFC Fight Night 62. However, he pulled out of the fight in early March citing an injury.

Saunders faced Kenny Robertson on July 25, 2015 at UFC on Fox 16. He won the back-and-forth fight by split decision.

Saunders faced Patrick Côté on January 17, 2016 at UFC Fight Night 81. He lost by TKO in the second round.

Saunders next faced Court McGee on January 15, 2017 at UFC Fight Night 103. He won the fight via unanimous decision.

Saunders faced Peter Sobotta on May 28, 2017 at UFC Fight Night 109. He lost the fight via TKO in the second round.

Saunders faced Alan Jouban on February 24, 2018 at UFC on Fox 28. He lost the back-and-forth fight via knockout in the second round. This fight earned him the Fight of the Night bonus.

Saunders faced Jake Ellenberger on June 1, 2018 at UFC Fight Night 131, replacing an injured Bryan Barberena. Saunders won the fight by TKO due to a knee to the liver and punches. This win earn him Performance of the Night award.

Saunders faced Sérgio Moraes on September 22, 2018 at UFC Fight Night 137. He lost the fight via a submission in round two.

Saunders faced Lyman Good on November 3, 2018 at UFC 230, replacing an injured Sultan Aliev. He lost the fight via knockout in round one.

Saunders faced promotional newcomer Takashi Sato on April 27, 2019 at UFC Fight Night: Jacaré vs. Hermansson. He lost the fight via TKO in the second round.

Saunders faced Matt Brown December 14, 2019 at UFC 245. He lost the fight via knockout in the second round. The fight marked the last fight of Saunders' prevailing contract and the UFC opted not to renew it, making Saunders a free agent.

Post UFC

Saunders faced Ramsey Nijem on July 30, 2021 at XMMA 2. He won the bout via unanimous decision.

Saunders has also announced that he will be opening a new branch of 10th Planet, in Orlando, Florida, where he will serve as the head coach.

Championships and accomplishments
Combat Fighting Championships
CFC Welterweight Championship (One time)
Ultimate Fighting Championship
Performance of the Night (Two times) vs. Chris Heatherly and Jake Ellenberger
Fight of the Night (One time)  vs. Alan Jouban
World MMA Awards
2014 Submission of the Year vs. Chris Heatherly at UFC Fight Night: Henderson vs. dos Anjos

Mixed martial arts record

 
|-
|Win
|align=center|23–13–2
|Ramsey Nijem
|Decision (unanimous)
|XMMA 2: Saunders vs. Nijem
|
|align=center|3
|align=center|5:00
|Greenville, South Carolina, United States
|   
|-
|Loss 
|align=center|22–13–2
|Matt Brown
|KO (elbow and punches)
|UFC 245 
|
|align=center|2
|align=center|4:55
|Las Vegas, Nevada, United States
|   
|-
|Loss 
|align=center|22–12–2
|Takashi Sato
|TKO (punches and elbows)
|UFC Fight Night: Jacaré vs. Hermansson 
|
|align=center|2
|align=center|1:18
|Sunrise, Florida, United States
|
|-
|Loss 
|align=center|22–11–2
|Lyman Good
|KO (punches)
|UFC 230 
|
|align=center|1
|align=center|1:32
|New York City, New York, United States
|
|-
|Loss
|align=center|22–10–2
|Sérgio Moraes
|Submission (arm-triangle choke)
|UFC Fight Night: Santos vs. Anders 
|
|align=center|2
|align=center|4:42
|São Paulo, Brazil
|
|-
|Win
|align=center|22–9–2
|Jake Ellenberger
|KO (knee to body)
|UFC Fight Night: Rivera vs. Moraes
|
|align=center|1
|align=center|1:56
|Utica, New York, United States
|
|-
|Loss
|align=center|21–9–2
|Alan Jouban
|KO (punch)
|UFC on Fox: Emmett vs. Stephens 
|
|align=center|2
|align=center|2:38
|Orlando, Florida, United States
|
|-
|Loss
|align=center|21–8–2
|Peter Sobotta
|TKO (punches and knee)
|UFC Fight Night: Gustafsson vs. Teixeira
|
|align=center|2
|align=center|2:29
|Stockholm, Sweden
| 
|-
|Win
|align=center|21–7–2
|Court McGee
|Decision (unanimous)
|UFC Fight Night: Rodríguez vs. Penn
|
|align=center|3
|align=center|5:00
|Phoenix, Arizona, United States
|
|-
|Win
|align=center|20–7–2
|Jacob Volkmann
|Submission (armbar)
|Fight Night at the Island
|
|align=center|1
|align=center|0:17
|Welch, Minnesota, United States
|  
|-
|Loss
|align=center|19–7–2
|Patrick Côté
|TKO (punches)
|UFC Fight Night: Dillashaw vs. Cruz
|
|align=center|2
|align=center|1:14
|Boston, Massachusetts, United States
|      
|-
|Win
|align=center|19–6–2
|Kenny Robertson
|Decision (split)
|UFC on Fox: Dillashaw vs. Barão 2
|
|align=center|3
|align=center|5:00
|Chicago, Illinois, United States
|
|-
|Win
|align=center|18–6–2
|Joe Riggs
|TKO (neck injury)
|UFC on Fox: dos Santos vs. Miocic
|
|align=center|1
|align=center|0:57
|Phoenix, Arizona, United States
| 
|-
|Win
|align=center|17–6–2
|Chris Heatherly
|Submission (omoplata)
|UFC Fight Night: Henderson vs. dos Anjos
|
|align=center|1
|align=center|2:18
|Tulsa, Oklahoma, United States
|
|-
|Loss
|align=center|16–6–2
|Douglas Lima
|KO (head kick)
|Bellator 100
|
|align=center|2
|align=center|4:33
|Phoenix, Arizona, United States
|
|-
|Win
|align=center|16–5–2
|Raul Amaya 
|KO (head kick)
|Bellator 90
|
|align=center|1
|align=center|2:56
|West Valley City, Utah, United States
|
|-
|Win
|align=center|15–5–2
|Koffi Adzitso
| Decision (unanimous)
|Bellator 86
|
|align=center|3
|align=center|5:00
|Thackerville, Oklahoma, United States
|
|-
|Win
|align=center|14–5–2
|Brian Warren
|TKO (knees)
|Bellator 72
|
|align=center|1
|align=center|0:22
|Tampa, Florida, United States
|
|-
|Loss
|align=center|13–5–2
|Bryan Baker
|Decision (unanimous)
|Bellator 67
|
|align=center|3
|align=center|5:00
|Rama, Ontario, Canada
|
|-
|Win
|align=center|13–4–2
|Raul Amaya
|Decision (unanimous)
|Bellator 63
|
|align=center|3
|align=center|5:00
|Uncasville, Connecticut, United States
|
|-
|Loss
|align=center|12–4–2
|Douglas Lima
|KO (punches)
|Bellator 57
|
|align=center|2
|align=center|1:21
|Rama, Ontario, Canada
|
|-
|Win
|align=center|12–3–2
|Luis Santos
|Submission (americana)
|Bellator 53
|
|align=center|3
|align=center|1:45
|Miami, Oklahoma, United States
|
|-
|Win
|align=center|11–3–2
|Chris Cisneros
|TKO (knee and punches)
|Bellator 49
|
|align=center|3
|align=center|0:29
|Atlantic City, New Jersey, United States
|
|-
|Win
|align=center|10–3–2
| Matt Lee
|TKO (doctor stoppage)
|Bellator 39
|
|align=center|3
|align=center|1:24
|Uncasville, Connecticut, United States
|
|-
|Win 
|align=center|9–3–2
|Elijah Harshbarger
|TKO (submission to punches and elbows)
|WEF: Saunders vs. Harshbarger
|
|align=center|1
|align=center|4:21
|Kissimmee, Florida, United States
|
|-
|Loss
|align=center|8–3–2
|Dennis Hallman
|Decision (unanimous)
|UFC 117
| 
|align=center|3
|align=center|5:00
|Oakland, California, United States
|
|-
|Loss
|align=center|8–2–2
|Jon Fitch
|Decision (unanimous)
|UFC 111
| 
|align=center|3
|align=center|5:00
|Newark, New Jersey, United States
|
|-
|Win
|align=center|8–1–2
|Marcus Davis
|KO (knees)
|UFC 106
| 
|align=center|1
|align=center|3:24
|Las Vegas, Nevada, United States
|
|-
|Loss
|align=center|7–1–2
|Mike Swick
|TKO (punches)
|UFC 99
| 
|align=center|2
|align=center|3:47
|Cologne, Germany
|
|-
|Win
|align=center|7–0–2
|Brandon Wolff
|TKO (knees)
|UFC: Fight for the Troops
| 
|align=center|1
|align=center|1:49
|Fayetteville, North Carolina, United States
|
|-
|Win
|align=center|6–0–2
|Ryan Thomas
|Submission (armbar)
|UFC 87
| 
|align=center|2
|align=center|2:28
|Minneapolis, Minnesota, United States
|
|-
|Win
|align=center|5–0–2
|Dan Barrera
|Decision (unanimous)
|The Ultimate Fighter: Team Hughes vs. Team Serra Finale
| 
|align=center|3
|align=center|5:00
|Las Vegas, Nevada, United States
|
|-
|Win
|align=center|4–0–2
|Charles Blanchard
|Submission (armbar)
|Combat Fighting Championships 3
| 
|align=center|1
|align=center|0:46
|Orlando, Florida, United States
|
|-
|Win
|align=center|3–0–2
|Kenny Stevens
|TKO (punches)
|Combat Fighting Championship 1
| 
|align=center|3
|align=center|3:05
|Orlando, Florida, United States
|
|-
|Win
|align=center|2–0–2
|Rick Delvecchio
|KO (head kick)
|Absolute Fighting Championships 15
| 
|align=center|1
|align=center|4:31
|Fort Lauderdale, Florida, United States
|
|-
|Win
|align=center|1–0–2
|Reggie Pena
|Submission (triangle choke)
|Absolute Fighting Championships 14
| 
|align=center|1
|align=center|1:12
|Fort Lauderdale, Florida, United States
|
|-
|Draw
|align=center|0–0–2
|Diego Lionel Vitosky
|Draw
|Absolute Fighting Championships 12
| 
|align=center|2
|align=center|5:00
|Fort Lauderdale, Florida, United States
|
|-
|Draw
|align=center|0–0–1
|Crafton Wallace
|Draw
|Absolute Fighting Championships 8
| 
|align=center|2
|align=center|5:00
|Fort Lauderdale, Florida, United States
|

See also
 List of current UFC fighters
 List of Bellator MMA alumni
 List of male mixed martial artists

References

External links
 

Ben Saunders' The Ultimate Fighter bio
Ben Saunders' TUF 6 Blog

American male mixed martial artists
Mixed martial artists from Florida
Mixed martial artists utilizing Jeet Kune Do
Mixed martial artists utilizing Brazilian jiu-jitsu
Welterweight mixed martial artists
Living people
1983 births
People awarded a black belt in Brazilian jiu-jitsu
American practitioners of Brazilian jiu-jitsu
Sportspeople from Fort Lauderdale, Florida
American Jeet Kune Do practitioners
People from Coral Springs, Florida
Ultimate Fighting Championship male fighters